The 2003 Kentucky Wildcats football team represented the University of Kentucky during the 2003 NCAA Division I-A football season. The team participated as members of the Southeastern Conference in the Eastern Division. They played their home games at Commonwealth Stadium in Lexington, Kentucky. The team was coached by Rich Brooks.

Schedule

Players on the team 

Starters are marked with an asterisk (*).

References

Kentucky
Kentucky Wildcats football seasons
2003 in sports in Kentucky